Secusio sansibarensis is a moth in the  subfamily Arctiinae. It was described by Strand in 1909. It is found in Tanzania (Zanzibar).

References

Natural History Museum Lepidoptera generic names catalog

Endemic fauna of Tanzania
Moths described in 1909
Arctiini